The 2018 Ivy League women's basketball tournament is a women's college conference tournament held March 10 and 11, 2018, at the Palestra on the campus of the University of Pennsylvania in Philadelphia. Princeton defeated Penn, 63–34, in the championship game to earn the Ivy League's automatic bid to the 2018 NCAA tournament.

Seeds
Only the top four teams in the 2017–18 Ivy League regular-season standings participated in the tournament and were seeded according to their records in conference play, resulting in a Shaughnessy playoff.

Schedule

*Game times in Eastern Time. #Rankings denote tournament seeding.

Bracket

See also
 2018 Ivy League men's basketball tournament

References

 

Ivy League women's basketball tournament
2017–18 Ivy League women's basketball season
Ivy League Women's B
Basketball competitions in Philadelphia
College basketball tournaments in Pennsylvania
Women's sports in Pennsylvania